Clementine Edle von Schuch-Proska, née Procházka, (12 February 1850  – 8 June 1932) was an Austrian operatic coloratura soprano, who became an audience favourite and an honorary member of the Dresden Court Opera as Kammersängerin.

Life and activity 

Immediately afterwards, in 1873, she was engaged to sing the debut role of Norina in Donizetti's Don Pasquale as coloratura soprano in Dresden at the Semperoper, where she became an audience favourite. In 1878, she received the appointment of Royal Chamber Singer.

Schuch-Proska had been married since 1875 to the conductor Ernst von Schuch (1846-1914). They took up residence in 1882 in Niederlößnitz in Weintraubenstraße (renamed in 1883 at their own request to Schuchstraße 15/17).

Guest appearances took her to Vienna in 1875 with the opera Lo speziale by Joseph Haydn, and later as an opera and concert singer at leading German theatres (Vienna Court Opera in 1881, 1882 and Berlin in 1881 as well as Zurich City Theatre in 1880) as well as to Moscow and St. Petersburg. At the Covent Garden Opera in London in 1884 she sang Eva in Wagner's Die Meistersinger von Nürnberg and Ännchen in Weber's Der Freischütz. The composer Pittrich, as Kammersängerin 1891, dedicated two of his early works written in Dresden to her the "Wiegendlied" and the song "Mägdlein, nimm dich in Acht" which became "immediately popular".

After her official retirement in 1894 with her former debut role as Norina in Donizetti's Don Pasquale, she still performed occasionally as a guest in Dresden until 1898, when she was made an honorary member. She was raised to the peerage by the Austrian Emperor in 1898 with her husband Ernst von Schuch. She was also awarded the medal "Virtuti et Ingenio" for her artistic achievements.

Schuch-Proska died in Kötzschenbroda, today Radebeul) at the age of 82.

Her daughter Liesel Schuch-Ganzel (1891-1990), the youngest of five children, and her elder sister Käthe (1885-1973; also née Ullmann and Schmidt respectively) also embarked on singing careers. The son Hans von Schuch (1886-1963), became a well-known cellist. His daughter Clementine von Schuch (1921-2014) also became an opera singer.

Roles 
 Königin der Nacht in The Magic Flute by Mozart
 Zerline in Don Giovanni by Mozart
 Ännchen in Der Freischütz by Carl Maria von Weber
 Marguerite in Faust by Charles Gounod
 Juliette in Roméo et Juliette by Charles Gounod
 Violetta in La traviata by Giuseppe Verdi
 Eva in Die Meistersinger von Nürnberg by Richard Wagner

Honours and awards 
In 1898, the Kammersängerin and her husband Ernst Schuch were raised to hereditary nobility by the Austrian Emperor Franz Joseph I with the title Edle von. At her stage farewell in the same year, which she gave with one of her signature roles, Norina in Donizetti's Don Pasquale, she was appointed honorary member of the Dresden Court Opera by the King Albert of Saxony.

Schuch received several awards in the course of her work:
 Saxony: Great Golden Medal Virtuti et ingenio (1887)
 Vereinigte herzogliche Häuser (Sachsen-Altenburg, Sachsen-Coburg und Gotha und Sachsen-Meiningen): Verdienstkreuz des Saxe-Ernestine House Order (1885)
 Austria-Hungary: Golden Medal for Art and Science (1881, (predecessor of the ), Civilian Medal of Honour (1881)
 Italy: Gold mMdaille of Amadeus Herzog von Aosta (1884)
 Romania: Medaille Bene Merenti I. Classe (1888)

Artist family 
The parents Ernst and Clementine von Schuch were followed by two further generations of musically gifted descendants:
 Ernst von Schuch (1846-1914), conductor and GMD ⚭ Clementine von Schuch-Proska (1850-1932), Kammersängerin (coloratura soprano)
 Käthe von Schuch-Schmidt (1885-1973), soprano
 Hans von Schuch (1886-1963), cellist
 Clementine von Schuch (1921-2014), soprano
 Liesel Schuch-Ganzel (1891-1990), Kammersängerin (coloratura soprano)

Further reading 
 Erika Eschebach (ed.), Andrea Rudolph (ed.): Die Schuchs. Eine Künstlerfamilie in Dresden. Sandstein Verlag, Dresden 2014, .
 
 Karl-Josef Kutsch, Leo Riemens: Großes Sängerlexikon. CD-ROM-Version (3. erweiterte Auflage (1997–2000)), vol. 4, 3158; vol. 6, 597.

References

External links 

 
 Liste von Bildern aus der Sammlung der UB Frankfurt
 Bruststück
 Familienbild (um 1910): Ehepaar Schuch mit Kindern im Garten. Aus: Die Schuchs – eine Künstlerfamilie in Dresden. Ausstellungsankündigung des Stadtmuseums (10 May until 28 September 2014).

Austrian operatic sopranos
1850 births
1932 deaths
People from Sopron
Edlers of Austria